Sildvik Hydroelectric Power Station is a hydroelectric power plant in Sildvik, Narvik municipality. It was inaugurated in 1982 and has a power of 63 MW.

See also

References

Buildings and structures in Nordland
Hydroelectric power stations in Norway
Narvik